Leon Miękina (5 July 1930 – 4 November 2013) was a Polish teacher, writer and translator.

Born in Cieszyn, he graduated from Catholic University of Lublin in 1955. After that he became a teacher in secondary schools in Cieszyn. He is a member of Macierz Ziemi Cieszyńskiej. From 1981 to 1996 he was a chairman of this organization.

Works

Poetry 
Szukając do-pełnienia (1980)
Przez pryzmat trioletu (1983)

Non-fictional 
Karola Miarki związki z Cieszynem (1985)
Prekursorzy (1988)
Znów minie wiek... Antologia literatury nadolziańskiej (2001)

References

External links 
Elektroniczny Słownik Biograficzny Śląska Cieszyńskiego

People from Cieszyn
Polish schoolteachers
Polish male poets
1930 births
2013 deaths
John Paul II Catholic University of Lublin alumni